Eric Joacim Esbjörs  (born July 4, 1970 in Gothenburg, Sweden) is a retired Swedish professional ice hockey player.

Esbjörs spent the majority of his career for Västra Frölunda HC.  Starting at junior level in 1986, he worked his way towards the senior squad, making his pro debut in 1988.  In 1992, Esbjörs was drafted 249th overall by the Hartford Whalers in the 1992 NHL Entry Draft, but never signed a contract and remained with Frölunda.  He stayed with the team until 1998 where he moved to Finland's SM-liiga with Ässät before returning to the Elitserien in 1999 with HV71.  He retired in 2001.

He is the son of ice hockey player Lars-Erik Esbjörs.

Career statistics

References

External links

1970 births
Ässät players
Frölunda HC players
Hartford Whalers draft picks
HV71 players
Living people
Swedish ice hockey defencemen
Swedish expatriate ice hockey players in Finland
Ice hockey people from Gothenburg